Orgel is a surname, and may refer to:

 Doris Orgel (born 1929), children's literature author
 Leslie Orgel (1927–2007), British chemist
 Stephen Orgel (21st century), Professor of English at Stanford University

See also
 Orgle (a kind of Llama).